Francis Kalnay (July 18, 1899 – December 2, 1992) was an American children's book author. He was born in Budapest, Hungary and moved to the United States in 1919, where he settled in Carmel, California. He is the author of Chucaro: Wild Pony of the Pampa, which won a Newbery Honor in 1959. He also wrote The Richest Boy in the World (Harcourt Brace, 1959; Angel Press, 1977).

References

External links

 

1899 births
Year of death missing
Place of death missing
American children's writers
Hungarian emigrants to the United States
Newbery Honor winners
People from Carmel-by-the-Sea, California